Sonneborn Building, also known as Paca-Pratt Building, is a historic loft building in Baltimore, Maryland, United States. Designed by Theodore Wells Pietsch, it is a nine-story loft building constructed in 1905 of "fireproof" reinforced-concrete construction, faced in buff-colored brick, with a coursed ashlar foundation and stone trim.  Its detailing reflects the Neoclassical Revival of the early 20th century. It was built for Henry Sonneborn and Company as a vertical clothing manufactory and was the tallest and largest strictly manufacturing building in the city of Baltimore.

Sonneborn Building was listed on the National Register of Historic Places in 1982. It is located in the Loft Historic District South.

References

External links
, including photo from 1984, at Maryland Historical Trust

Buildings and structures in Baltimore
Commercial buildings on the National Register of Historic Places in Baltimore
Commercial buildings completed in 1905
Downtown Baltimore
Neoclassical architecture in Maryland
Historic district contributing properties in Maryland
1905 establishments in Maryland